This is a list of United States telephone companies.

Regional Bell Operating Companies
The Regional Bell Operating Companies (RBOCs) are the result of the break-up of the Bell System in 1984. After numerous mergers, asset sales, and renamings since the break-up, these are the current successor RBOCs:

AT&T Inc.: Alabama, Arkansas, California, Florida, Georgia, Illinois, Indiana, Kansas, Kentucky, Louisiana, Michigan, Mississippi, Missouri, Nevada, North Carolina, Ohio, Oklahoma, South Carolina, Tennessee, Texas, Wisconsin
Verizon: Delaware, District of Columbia, Maryland, Massachusetts, New Jersey, New York, Pennsylvania, Rhode Island, Virginia
CenturyLink: Bell System (RBOC) lines (from Qwest) in Arizona, Colorado, Idaho, Iowa, Minnesota, Montana, Nebraska, New Mexico, North Dakota, Oregon, South Dakota, Utah, Washington, Wyoming. Also serves non-Bell System ILEC areas in parts of those states as well as Florida and Nevada. Other non-RBOC states were sold to Brightspeed in 2022.
Frontier Communications: Mixture of some RBOC lines (see below) and non-Bell System ILEC areas (e.g. GTE areas acquired from Verizon) covering the vast majority of lines in Connecticut and West Virginia, as well as parts of Alabama, Arizona, California, Florida, Georgia, Illinois, Indiana, Iowa, Michigan, Minnesota, Mississippi, Nebraska, Nevada, New Mexico, New York, North Carolina, Ohio, Pennsylvania, South Carolina, Tennessee, Texas, Utah, and Wisconsin.

Other major incumbent local exchange carriers 
In the following states and regions, the primary local carrier (ILEC) is not an RBOC:
 CenturyLink, in addition to its role as the RBOC in the areas of 14 states gained from its acquisition of Qwest, CenturyLink serves other rural, suburban, and smaller city local exchanges, as well as most of the Las Vegas metropolitan area, covering a total of 16 states. Operations in 20 other states were sold to Brightspeed in 2022. 
 Frontier Communications, in addition to its role as the RBOC for West Virginia, now serves mainly rural and some suburban and smaller city areas in 27 other states (many formerly part of the GTE ILEC system purchased from Verizon). It also purchased AT&T's landline business in Connecticut in 2013, though these are not considered an RBOC, as the Southern New England Telephone Company, from which they descend, was a franchisee of the Bell System, and not subject to the same regulations after the Bell System breakup. 
 Windstream, founded in 2006 with the spinoff of Alltel's wireline division and simultaneous merger with Valor Telecom, serves mainly rural areas in 29 states.
 Consolidated Communications, in addition to access lines in Maine, New Hampshire, and Vermont, in Northern New England which it gained from its acquisition of FairPoint, also serves rural areas in a combined total of 22 states.
 Telephone and Data Systems, (through its subsidiary TDS) serves mainly rural areas in parts of 36 states.
 Cincinnati Bell, which serves the greater Cincinnati area, and Hawaii due to its acquisition of Hawaiian Telcom was not included in the Bell System breakup of 1984 because the former AT&T held only a minority stake in that company.
 Verizon, in addition to its role as a RBOC in its areas retained in the East, serves former GTE areas in Pennsylvania and Virginia. Verizon formerly served ex-GTE areas in parts of California, Florida and Texas before selling to Frontier Communications in 2016. 
 Claro Puerto Rico, which serves every exchange in Puerto Rico, has been owned by the international telecommunications giant América Móvil since in 2007.

Many other individual communities or smaller regions are also served by non-RBOC companies.

See also 
 Lists of public utilities
 Telephone cooperatives in the USA
 List of Canadian telephone companies

Notes

Telephone companies, List of United States

United States telephone